Inflated sedge is a common name for several plants and may refer to:

Carex intumescens, bladder sedge
Carex vesicaria, blister sedge